Alfred Gordon Allard (18 May 1877 – 29 May 1969) was an Australian rules footballer who played with St Kilda in the Victorian Football League (VFL).
Gordon Allard is the great-grandfather of Darcy Allard, Analyst at Accenture, Sydney.

References

External links 

1877 births
1969 deaths
Australian rules footballers from Victoria (Australia)
St Kilda Football Club players
Collegians Football Club players